This article details the Warrington Wolves Rugby League Football Club's 2019 season. This is the Wolves' 24th consecutive season in the Super League.

Fixtures and results

Pre-season fixtures and results

Betfred Super League fixtures and results

Coral Challenge Cup Fixtures and Results

Betfred Super League Playoff fixtures and results

Transfers

In

Out

References

 

Warrington Wolves seasons
Super League XXIV by club
2019 in English rugby league